Christopher Armas (born August 27, 1972) is an American professional soccer coach and former player. He is currently the assistant head coach at Leeds United.

Youth and college
Born in The Bronx, New York City, Armas is of Puerto Rican descent and grew up in Brentwood, New York. He graduated from St. Anthony's High School and then attended Adelphi University from 1990 to 1993, amassing 17 goals and 15 assists over his collegiate career. Armas was named an NCAA Division II First Team All-American his senior year.

Playing career

Professional
After graduating from college, Armas spent 1994 and 1995 playing for the USISL's Long Island Rough Riders, being selected as a USISL All-Star. In 1995, the Rough Riders defeated the Minnesota Thunder in the USISL's Pro League Championship.

In 1996, Armas was drafted by Los Angeles Galaxy in the first round of the Major League Soccer Supplemental Draft and played a significant role in their first and second seasons. Chicago Fire acquired Armas in a trade for their inaugural 1998 campaign. It was with the 1998 Fire team that Armas emerged as an exceptional player, helping them win their first MLS Championship that year. Between 1998 and 2001, Armas was named to the MLS Best XI four consecutive times, his streak only being broken by an ACL injury that kept him out of much of the 2002 campaign; Armas was named to his fifth Best XI after the 2003 MLS season, in addition to being named the MLS Comeback Player of the Year. He was named U.S. Soccer Athlete of the Year in 2000. In ten years in MLS, he totaled 11 goals and 41 assists, plus added four goals and four assists in the playoffs.

On April 19, 2007, Armas announced that the 2007 MLS season with the Chicago Fire would be his last, as he decided to retire. His retirement was made official on November 13, 2007, after spending 12 years in MLS.

International
Armas played for Puerto Rico in the 1993 Caribbean Cup. The competition was not then recognized by FIFA and so his five matches were classed as friendlies.

He was therefore later allowed to switch his allegiance to the United States, for whom he made his debut November 6, 1998, against Australia. He went on to earn 66 caps. He did not break into the squad until soon after the 1998 FIFA World Cup, and his ACL injury came just before the 2002 FIFA World Cup, so he was never able to play for the United States in the World Cup. He was named as a standby player for the 2006 FIFA World Cup, and did not feature in the final squad.

Coaching career
After his retirement, he coached youth soccer and was a high school physical education teacher at St. Anthony's High School.

Armas served as an assistant coach for the Chicago Fire in 2008 and was the head women's soccer coach at Adelphi University between 2011 and 2015.

On July 6, 2018, Armas was promoted to head coach of New York Red Bulls after former manager Jesse Marsch departed the club to join RB Salzburg as an assistant. Armas helped the Red Bulls finish first in the regular season, winning the Supporters' Shield as a result. The Red Bulls were eliminated in the conference finals by Atlanta United FC.

In 2019, the Red Bulls finished sixth in the Eastern Conference and were eliminated by the Philadelphia Union in the first round of the playoffs. The Red Bulls were then eliminated in the group stage of the MLS is Back Tournament after they were defeated by FC Cincinnati. The team was in the middle of a scoring slump when Armas parted ways with the club on September 4, 2020, the day after a 1–0 loss to D.C. United.

In 2021, Armas was hired as head coach of Toronto FC, replacing Greg Vanney, who departed the club at the end of his contract. On July 4, 2021, following a 7–1 loss to D.C. United, the largest loss in club history and a league record of 1 win, 8 losses, and 2 draws, the team announced he had been fired.

On December 7, 2021, Armas was hired by Manchester United as assistant coach to work under interim manager Ralf Rangnick. He left the club in May 2022.

In January 2023, it was confirmed that Armas had re-united with Jesse Marsch at Leeds United. Armas was named co-interim head coach alongside Michael Skubala and Paco Gallardo following the sacking of Jesse Marsch in February, the trio overseeing a 2-2 draw at Old Trafford with Manchester United on 8
February 2023 and Skubala acting as solitary interim manager in the home loss against the same opponents four days later.

Personal life
Armas and his wife, Justine, have two sons, Christopher and Aleksei.

Career statistics

Club

International

Scores and results list the United States' goal tally first, score column indicates score after each Armas goal.

Coaching

Honors

Player
Chicago Fire
 MLS Cup: 1998
 Supporters' Shield: 2003
 U.S. Open Cup: 1998, 2000, 2003, 2006

United States
 CONCACAF Gold Cup: 2002, 2005
 U.S. Soccer Athlete of the Year: 2000

Individual
 MLS Best XI: 1998, 1999, 2000, 2001, 2003
 MLS All-Star: 1998, 1999, 2000, 2001, 2003, 2004
 MLS Comeback Player of the Year: 2003
 Chicago Fire MVP: 2003

Coach
New York Red Bulls
 Supporters' Shield: 2018

References

External links
 
 
 
 

1972 births
Living people
American people of Puerto Rican descent
American soccer players
American soccer coaches
United States men's international soccer players
Puerto Rican footballers
Puerto Rican football managers
Puerto Rico international footballers
Sportspeople from the Bronx
Soccer players from New York City
Association football midfielders
Adelphi University alumni
Adelphi Panthers men's soccer players
Long Island Rough Riders players
LA Galaxy draft picks
LA Galaxy players
Chicago Fire FC players
USISL players
USL Second Division players
Major League Soccer players
Dual internationalists (football)
2000 CONCACAF Gold Cup players
2002 CONCACAF Gold Cup players
2003 FIFA Confederations Cup players
2005 CONCACAF Gold Cup players
CONCACAF Gold Cup-winning players
Major League Soccer All-Stars
Chicago Fire FC non-playing staff
Adelphi Panthers women's soccer coaches
New York Red Bulls non-playing staff
New York Red Bulls coaches
Toronto FC coaches
Major League Soccer coaches
Manchester United F.C. non-playing staff
Association football coaches